Silvestridia is a genus of proturans in the family Acerentomidae.

Species
 Silvestridia africana Yin & Dallai, 1985
 Silvestridia artiochaeta Bonet, 1942
 Silvestridia hutan Imadaté, 1965
 Silvestridia keijiana Imadaté, 1965
 Silvestridia solomonis (Imadaté, 1960)

References

Protura